Juan Ángel Albín Leites (born 17 July 1986) is a Uruguayan footballer who plays as an attacking midfielder or a winger for Uruguayan Segunda División club Rampla Juniors.

After starting out at Nacional, he spent the first part of his career in La Liga and went on acquire Spanish citizenship. He amassed league totals of 129 matches and 21 goals over seven seasons in the latter country, representing Getafe and Espanyol in the competition.

Other than Uruguay and Spain, Albín played professionally in Romania, Mexico and Cyprus.

Club career

Nacional
Born in Salto, Salto Department, Albín started his career at Club Nacional de Football, where he won two Primera División championships. His strong performances earned him a transfer to Spanish club Getafe CF in the 2006 summer transfer window.

Getafe
Albín featured sparingly in his first season (13 La Liga games), but became first choice the following campaign as the Madrid outskirts team reached the quarter-finals of the UEFA Cup and a mid-table league position. After a coaching change brought Míchel to the bench, however, he began appearing less regularly; on 29 November 2008, in a rare start, he scored in a 3–1 home win over Real Madrid.

On 21 April 2009, also against Real Madrid, Albín was struck in the face by Pepe, in the mêlée which resulted after the Portuguese's aggression on Javier Casquero. He continued being used intermittently in 2010–11, netting a last-minute winner at home against Villarreal CF on 11 December 2010 but also being sent off for lifting his shirt, in a second bookable offence.

Espanyol
In mid-April 2011, Getafe agreed to sell Albín to RCD Espanyol for €3 million, as his contract was set to expire in June 2012. He spent several months of his first season on the sidelines, nursing a leg injury.

Albín scored his first goal for the Catalans on 4 February 2012, netting in the 92nd minute for a 3–3 away draw against Athletic Bilbao. In January 2013, due to lack of playing time, he was loaned to his former club Nacional.

Later career

On 6 September 2013, Albín signed a one-year contract with FC Petrolul Ploiești in Romania, rejoining his former Getafe teammate Cosmin Contra who was now a manager. He made his Liga I debut on the 21st, scoring his team's goal in a 1–1 draw at FC Dinamo București. 

On 31 March 2014, Albín chose to extend his link by one year even if at that time Contra had already left. He ended the campaign with 28 matches and ten goals in all competitions.

Albín scored against GNK Dinamo Zagreb in the second leg of the Europa League play-off round, on 28 August 2014; however, his side lost 5–2 on aggregate and failed to progress to the group stage. On 16 December, as Petrolul faced financial issues which led to insolvency and ultimately bankruptcy, he was transferred to C.D. Veracruz of Mexico.

Albín returned to Romania and its top division nearly three years later, joining Dinamo București on a season-long loan with an option to buy. On 18 July 2018, the 32-year-old joined Cypriot First Division club AC Omonia.

International career
Albín represented Uruguay at under-17 and under-20 levels. In March 2009, he was called to the full side by Óscar Tabárez ahead of a 2010 FIFA World Cup qualifier against Paraguay, but remained unused in the 2–0 victory and never won a cap.

Style of play
Albín was a left-footed attacking midfielder who could also be deployed as a winger. He was described as a footballer with "great speed and a very good technique".

During his first stint in Romania, Albín was known as an excellent free kick taker, and in 2016 former international Adrian Mutu went as far to state that he was the best foreigner that the league ever had.

Honours
Nacional
Uruguayan Primera División: 2005, 2005–06

Getafe
Copa del Rey runner-up: 2006–07, 2007–08

Veracruz
Copa MX: Clausura 2016

References

External links

1986 births
Living people
People from Salto, Uruguay
Naturalised citizens of Spain
Uruguayan footballers
Association football midfielders
Association football wingers
Uruguayan Primera División players
Uruguayan Segunda División players
Club Nacional de Football players
Rampla Juniors players
Defensor Sporting players
La Liga players
Getafe CF footballers
RCD Espanyol footballers
Liga I players
FC Petrolul Ploiești players
FC Dinamo București players
Liga MX players
C.D. Veracruz footballers
Cypriot First Division players
AC Omonia players
Uruguay youth international footballers
Uruguay under-20 international footballers
Uruguayan expatriate footballers
Expatriate footballers in Spain
Expatriate footballers in Romania
Expatriate footballers in Mexico
Expatriate footballers in Cyprus
Uruguayan expatriate sportspeople in Spain
Uruguayan expatriate sportspeople in Romania
Uruguayan expatriate sportspeople in Mexico
Uruguayan expatriate sportspeople in Cyprus